William C. Hazelton (September 1, 1835 – March 2, 1898) was an American lawyer, politician, and judge from New York.

Life 
Hazelton was born on September 1, 1835, in Ulysses, New York, the son of farmer Elijah Hazelton and Mary Ann Clark.

In 1842, Hazelton moved Covert with his parents. When he was 20, he began studying in the law office of Dana, Beers & Howard in Ithaca. He was admitted to the bar in 1858. He then spent the next four years working as a clerk in the law office of H. A. Dowe. In 1862, he was elected District Attorney of Seneca County. He was re-elected to the office in 1868 and 1880.

Hazelton served a term as justice of the peace for Ovid, where he practiced law. In 1873, he was elected to the New York State Assembly as a Democrat, representing Seneca County. He served in the Assembly in 1874. He was County Judge and Surrogate for six years.

In 1876, Hazelton married Sarah Pratt. Their children were Laura, Emma, and Charles P.

Hazelton died on March 2, 1898.

References

External links 
The Political Graveyard

1835 births
1898 deaths
People from Tompkins County, New York
People from Ovid, New York
County district attorneys in New York (state)
New York (state) state court judges
19th-century American lawyers
19th-century American judges
County judges in the United States
American justices of the peace
19th-century American politicians
Democratic Party members of the New York State Assembly